OP-2 (ОП-2), or Ionov's salt, indicated on the package as Н. А., is a chemical substance used as a thickener. Due to the same orders as the initials of its name, OP-2 was, for a long time, interpreted as being the opalm, a "hybrid" swiss thickener.

Effect 
Contact with the lit material causes deep burns, due to the retarding effect of the thickener on the fuel and due to the greater thermal conduction given by the salt. It is an incendiary agent with anti-personnel and limited anti-material effect. It is used as a defoliant to deprive enemy personnel of cover and camouflage.

Use 

The use of the OP-2 is identical to that of napalm, being used extensively by any projector of incendiary material. The employment concentration is identical to that of napalm.

It is a precursor used to obtain incendiary weapons. It was employed by the Soviet Union during the early part of World War II to prepare flamethrower fuel (ROKS-3 and LPO-50), molotov cocktail and general incendiary weaponry. It continues to be employed by the Russian army. For example, it is used to prepare the AP-10, which fills the ZB-500 incendiary shell.

Composition 
The principle of a viscous incendiary weapon was first realized in the early Middle Ages in the form of Greek fire. In modern times, the first tests were carried out during the first world war in the form of solidified oil, developed by CWS. Gasoline and rubber mixtures were tested post-war and during the early stages of WWII. Rubber shortages, caused by the territorial expansion of imperial Japan, forced it to be replaced by synthetic materials.

During the early stages of the WWII, A. P. Ionov and Piotr Alexandrovich Rehbinder, in 1939, specialized aluminum naphthenate to be inserted into fuels in order to thicken them.

After Pearl Harbor, the CWS began hiring personal to investigate a natural rubber substitute in the US. The end result of the investigation was an aluminum soap that specialized in thickening fine fuels.

References 
Incendiary weapons
Soaps
World War II weapons
Soviet inventions

Works cited 

 A, N, Ardashev. (2009). Зажигательное и огнеметное оружие. ISBN 978-5-699-33627-2

Vietnam War